Soeli Garvão Zakrzeski (born 12 November 1977) is a Brazilian basketball player. She competed in the women's tournament at the 2008 Summer Olympics.

References

External links
 

1977 births
Living people
Brazilian women's basketball players
Olympic basketball players of Brazil
Basketball players at the 2008 Summer Olympics
Sportspeople from Paraná (state)